That's Me Right There is the debut extended play (EP) by American recording artist Jasmine V. It was released on November 10, 2014 by Interscope Records. It was preceded by the release of title track "That's Me Right There" on August 5, 2014.

Background and development
On October 30, 2014, it was confirmed by Villegas via Twitter that the title of the EP would be That's Me Right There with a release date set for November 10. Its cover artwork and track listing were revealed the same day.

Singles
Title track "That's Me Right There" was released on August 5, 2014 as the EP's lead single. After the EP have been released, "I Love Your Crazy" was confirmed as the second lead single, also "Walk Away" as the third lead single.

Track listing

Release history

References

2014 debut EPs
Interscope Records EPs
Albums produced by Harmony Samuels